The Tragic City Rollers is a women's flat track roller derby league based in Birmingham, Alabama. Founded in 2005

Tragic City is a member of the Women's Flat Track Derby Association (WFTDA).

History
The league was founded in December 2005 by Dixie Thrash, after hearing about the Texas Rollergirls, and training with the Dixie Derby Girls for two months. The league's first bout was also against Dixie, in April 2006.

Tragic City was accepted into the WFTDA Apprentice Program in October 2010, and became a full member of the WFTDA in March 2012.

WFTDA rankings

References

Sports in Birmingham, Alabama
Roller derby leagues established in 2005
Roller derby leagues in Alabama
Women's Flat Track Derby Association Division 3
2005 establishments in Alabama